SM UB-34 was a German Type UB II submarine or U-boat in the German Imperial Navy during World War I. The U-boat was ordered on 22 July 1915 and launched on 5 December 1915. She was commissioned into the German Imperial Navy on 10 June 1916 as SM UB-34.

UB-34 sank 31 ships in 21 patrols. They included the William Cory and Son collier SS Hurstwood, which UB-34 torpedoed and sank in the North Sea off Whitby on 5 February 1917.

The submarine served in the Training Flotilla at the end of the war and was surrendered on 26 November 1918 in accordance with the requirements of the Armistice with Germany. UB-34 was broken up in Canning Town in 1922.

Design 
A German Type UB II submarine, UB-34 had a displacement of  when at the surface and  while submerged. The submarine was powered by two Benz six-cylinder diesel engines producing a total , two Siemens-Schuckert electric motors producing , and one propeller shaft.

UB-34 was fitted with two  torpedo tubes, four torpedoes, and one  Uk L/30 deck gun. She had a complement of twenty-one crew members and two officers and a 42-second dive time.

Summary of raiding history

References

Notes

Citations

Bibliography 

 

1915 ships
Ships built in Hamburg
World War I submarines of Germany
German Type UB II submarines
U-boats commissioned in 1916